PPT may refer to:

Organizations 
 Parti Progressiste Tchadien, a political party active in Chad between 1947 and 1973
 Partido del Pueblo Trabajador (Working People's Party of Puerto Rico), a political party in Puerto Rico
 Patria Para Todos, a left-wing political party in Venezuela
 Permanent Peoples' Tribunal, an international opinion tribunal founded in Bologna, 1979
 Plunge Protection Team, a nickname of the United States President's Working Group on Financial Markets
 Porin Pallo-Toverit, the former name of the Finnish football club FC Jazz

Science and technology 
 .ppt, the file format used by Microsoft PowerPoint presentation software
 Parts-per notation for parts-per-trillion (more common) or parts-per-thousand (less common)
 PerlPowerTools, a revitalized of the classic Unix command set in pure Perl
 Positive partial transpose, a criterion used in quantum mechanics
 Power point tracking, a solar energy charging technology
 Primitive Pythagorean triple, three integers that form a right triangle
 Probabilistic polynomial-time, a class of Turing machines that are probabilistic and run in polynomial-time
 Pulsed plasma thruster, a method of spacecraft propulsion

Biology and medicine 
 Palmitoyl protein thioesterase, enzymes that remove thioester-linked fatty acyl groups
 PPT1, a member of the palmitoyl protein thioesterase family
 PPT2, a member of the palmitoyl protein thioesterase family
 Pedunculopontine tegmental nucleus, a collection of neurons located in the brainstem
 Podophyllotoxin, a medical cream to treat genital warts
 Propylpyrazoletriol, a selective agonist of ERα used in scientific research
 Protopanaxatriol, a molecule found in ginseng

Transportation 
 Faa'a International Airport (IATA airport code), Papeete, Tahiti, French Polynesia
 Personal public transport, a transportation model

Games 
 Partouche Poker Tour, a poker tournament
 Professional Poker Tour, a series of televised poker tournaments

Other 
 Periodismo para todos, a journalist TV programme of Argentina